Katherine Hicks is an Australian actress. She is known for her roles as Heidi Wilson on Rescue: Special Ops and Sam MacKenzie on Winners & Losers.

Hicks was born in Melbourne, Victoria, and grew up on a farm in Byron Bay, New South Wales. She completed her HSC at Byron Bay High School.

References

External links

 

Australian television actresses
People from Melbourne
Living people
Year of birth missing (living people)